Overton County is a county located in the U.S. state of Tennessee. As of the 2020 census, the population was 22,511. Its county seat is Livingston. Overton County is part of the Cookeville, TN Micropolitan Statistical Area.

History
On May 10, 1933, a half-mile wide F4 tornado struck the small community of Beatty Swamps (also referred to as Bethsadia). The tornado destroyed every structure in the town and either killed or injured nearly every inhabitant, with 33 of the 35 deaths occurring in the area. Much of the area was swept clean of debris, a reaper-binder was thrown , and cars were moved hundreds of feet.

Geography

Overton County straddles the Eastern Highland Rim, and generally consists of low, rolling hills divided by narrow creek valleys.  The backwaters of Dale Hollow Lake, namely the Mitchell Creek and Big Eagle Creek sections, spill over into the northern part of the county. The County is located on the Cumberland Plateau.

Adjacent counties
Pickett County (northeast)
Fentress County (east)
Putnam County (south)
Jackson County (west)
Clay County (northwest)

State protected areas
Alpine Mountain Wildlife Management Area
Jackson Swamp Wildlife Management Area
Standing Stone State Forest (part)
Standing Stone State Park

Demographics

2020 census

As of the 2020 United States census, there were 22,511 people, 9,140 households, and 6,220 families residing in the county.

2000 census
As of the census of 2000, there were 20,118 people, 8,110 households, and 5,920 families residing in the county. The population density was 46 people per square mile (18/km2). There were 9,168 housing units at an average density of 21 per square mile (8/km2). The racial makeup of the county was 94.59% White, 0.28% Black or African American, 2.28% Native American, 0.09% Asian, 0.05% Pacific Islander, 0.22% from other races, and 0.49% from two or more races. 2.69% of the population were Hispanic or Latino of any race.

There were 8,110 households, out of which 29.20% had children under the age of 18 living with them, 59.20% were married couples living together, 9.90% had a female householder with no husband present, and 27.00% were non-families. 24.10% of all households were made up of individuals, and 11.00% had someone living alone who was 65 years of age or older. The average household size was 2.46 and the average family size was 2.90.

In the county, the population was spread out, with 23.00% under the age of 18, 8.40% from 18 to 24, 27.70% from 25 to 44, 25.90% from 45 to 64, and 15.00% who were 65 years of age or older. The median age was 39 years. For every 100 females, there were 96.20 males. For every 100 females age 18 and over, there were 93.10 males.

The median income for a household in the county was $26,915, and the median income for a family was $32,156. Males had a median income of $25,287 versus $19,674 for females. The per capita income for the county was $13,910. About 12.30% of families and 16.00% of the population were below the poverty line, including 20.40% of those under age 18 and 20.50% of those age 65 or over.

Communities

Town
Livingston (county seat)

Unincorporated communities

Allons
Allred
Alpine
Crawford
Hardy's Chapel
Hilham
Mineral Springs
Monroe
Rickman
Timothy

Notable people

 Lester Flatt, Bluegrass musician
 Thomas D. Harp, California state senator born in Overton County
 Albert H. Roberts, Governor of Tennessee
 Roy Roberts, Blues singer
 Catherine "Bonny Kate" Sevier, widow of John Sevier
 Cordell Hull United States Secretary of State
 Josiah Gregg merchant, explorer, naturalist, and author of Commerce of the Prairies
 Benoni Strivson Medal of Honor Recipient Indian Wars

Politics

See also
 Alpine Institute
 National Register of Historic Places listings in Overton County, Tennessee
 Standing Stone State Park
 USS Overton County (LST-1074)

References

External links
 
 Official site
 Overton County, TNGenWeb - free genealogy resources for the county

 
1806 establishments in Tennessee
Populated places established in 1806
Cookeville, Tennessee micropolitan area
Counties of Appalachia
Middle Tennessee